Maschinenfabrik Oerlikon was a Swiss engineering company based in the Zürich district of Oerlikon known for the early development of electric locomotives. It was founded in 1876 by the industrialist Peter Emil Huber-Werdmüller, and occupied a large site immediately to the west of Oerlikon railway station.

In 1906 the armaments business was demerged to form , which evolved into the technology company OC Oerlikon and the armaments company Rheinmetall Air Defence (formerly Oerlikon Contraves).

In 1967 Maschinenfabrik Oerlikon was taken over by Brown, Boveri & Cie, which in 1988 merged with ASEA to form ABB Group.

The site of the company's works has been redeveloped, including the innovative public MFO-Park. In the second decade of the 21st century, a project was initiated to expand Oerlikon railway station, with the provision of two additional platform tracks on north-western side of the station. This affected the site of the former office building of Maschinenfabrik Oerlikon, dating from the late 19th century and now a restaurant complex known as Gleis 9. Because of its cultural importance to the region, plans to demolish the building were rejected, and instead the  building was moved  to the west on specially laid tracks. The move took place in May 2012, and took 19 hours.

References

External links 
 

ABB
Locomotive manufacturers of Switzerland
Electrical engineering companies
Manufacturing companies based in Zürich
Manufacturing companies established in 1876
Swiss companies established in 1876